The 2018–19 FC Akhmat Grozny season was the tenth successive season that the club will play in the Russian Premier League, the highest tier of association football in Russia, and their second as Akhmat Grozny. Akhmat Grozny finished the season in 8th place, whilst also reaching the Round of 16 in the  Russian Cup, where they were defeated by Arsenal Tula.

Season review
On 2 September, Lediakhov resigned as manager, with Ruslan İdiqov being appointed as the caretaker manager. On 5 September, Akhmat Grozny announced the return of Rashid Rakhimov as manager.

On 19 May, Andrei Semyonov signed a new contract with Akhmat Grozny, keeping him at the club until 2022.

On 25 May, Yevgeni Gorodov signed a new one-year contract, whilst Odise Roshi signed a new three-year contract that will keep him in Grozny until the summer of 2022.

On 27 May, Akhmat Grozny announced that Milad Mohammadi and Bekim Balaj had left the club after their contracts had expired, whilst Rodolfo had retired and joined their coaching staff, and Ablaye Mbengue had signed a new three-year contract, keeping him in Grozny until the summer of 2022.

Squad

On loan

Left club during season

Transfers

In

Out

Loans in

Loans out

Released

Friendlies

Competitions

Premier League

Results by round

Results

League table

Cup

Squad statistics

Appearances and goals

|-
|colspan="14"|Players away from the club on loan:

|-
|colspan="14"|Players who appeared for Akhmat Grozny but left during the season:

|}

Goal scorers

Disciplinary record

References

FC Akhmat Grozny seasons
Akhmat Grozny